Kirkman House is an historic building in Arnprior, Ontario in Canada

The house was built in the 1870s. In 1916, it was converted into the Sacred Heart Convent.  In 1996 it was renamed Kirkman House opened as a bed and breakfast.

The house is site #13 on a heritage trail of Arnprior historic sites.

References

Buildings and structures in Renfrew County
Houses in Ontario